Fila or FILA may refer to:

Businesses and organizations
 Fila (company), an Italian sports brand founded by Ettore and Giansevero Fila
 F.I.L.A. (company), an international supplier of art materials and related products
 Fédération Internationale des Luttes Associées (International Federation of Associated Wrestling Styles), the former name of United World Wrestling

People
 Fila Fuamatu, Samoan powerlifter
 Rudolf Fila (1932–2015), Slovak painter and author
 Toma Fila, Serbian lawyer and politician

Places
 Fila, an island of Vanuatu
 Fila, Iran, a village in Lorestan Province, Iran

Other
 Fila (hat), a traditional Yoruba cap
 Fila Brazillia, an English electronica duo
 Fila Brasileiro or Brazilian Mastiff, a large working breed of dog developed in Brazil
 Fly International Luxurious Art, a 2015 album by American rapper Raekwon

See also
 Phila (disambiguation)
 Primera Fila (disambiguation), a Sony Music album series